Lucy Rahman is a Bangladeshi-born British singer.

Early life
Rahman was born in Dhaka, East Pakistan (now Bangladesh) into a family of famous musicians, artists and poets. From the age of six, she was trained in Indian Classical and semi-classical music by her father, Lutfor Rahman, who was a classical singer and a successful composer. She then enrolled at the Nazrul Academy, where she studied for six years and gained her diploma. Lucy was awarded “Sursaki” from her music college as the most promising vocalist of her generation.

Career
In 1983, Rahman moved to London, England with her husband, Mohammad Habib Rahman. She has appeared on numerous television shows such as Channel 4's Eastern Eye and as well as performing in places such as Belgium, the Netherlands and the U.S.

Since 1998, Rahman has been one of the lead singers of the jazz music group Grand Union Orchestra. She has performed on numerous stage, television and radio shows both in Bangladesh and the UK. She has toured with the Grand Union Orchestra which has meant she has visited many places across the UK, including Sadler's Wells Theatre, Queen Elizabeth Hall and the Barbican Centre.

Rahman has also performed by herself on stage in the UK and various international venues, notably New York City, Berlin, Brussels and Paris. She also performed solo  for BBC and Channel 4 television. She also sang as a playback singer for a number of television films, including A Kind of English and King of the Ghetto.

In 2015, Rahman was a vocalist in Amina Khayyam's adaptation of Federico García Lorca's play Yerma.

Discography 

 'Notun Desh, Notun Jiban (New Land, New Life)' on Now Comes The Dragon's Hour – Grand Union Orchestra (RedGold Records, 1997)
 'Tomar Basane' on 12 For 12 – Grand Union Orchestra (RedGold Records, 2011)
 'The Notes of Perfume' on If Paradise – Grand Union Orchestra (RedGold Records, 2011)
 'The Song of Separation' on If Paradise – Grand Union Orchestra (RedGold Records, 2011)
 'The Perfumes of Paradise Blues' on If Paradise – Grand Union Orchestra (RedGold Records, 2011)

See also
British Bangladeshi
List of British Bangladeshis
Music of Bengal

References

External links

1960s births
Living people
Year of birth missing (living people)
British Muslims
Bangladeshi emigrants to England
20th-century Bangladeshi women singers
20th-century Bangladeshi singers
Bangladeshi playback singers
British playback singers
Bengali-language singers
Singers from London
People from Dhaka
People from Ilford
21st-century Bangladeshi women singers
21st-century Bangladeshi singers